King's Cove is a town in the Canadian province of Newfoundland and Labrador. The post office was established in 1851. Its founder was James Aylward from Keels, who was born in Ireland in county Cork in 1690. His direct descendants still live in the community.

Demographics 

See also 
 List of lighthouses in Canada
 List of cities and towns in Newfoundland and Labrador
 Royal eponyms in Canada

References

External links
 Aids to Navigation Canadian Coast Guard

Towns in Newfoundland and Labrador
Lighthouses in Newfoundland and Labrador